Payerne District was a district of the canton of Vaud in Switzerland.

Mergers and name changes
 On 1 July 2006, Rossens and Sédeilles merged into the municipality of Villarzel.  
 On 1 September 2006 the municipalities of Cerniaz (VD), Champtauroz, Chevroux, Combremont-le-Grand, Combremont-le-Petit, Corcelles-près-Payerne, Grandcour, Granges-près-Marnand, Henniez, Marnand, Missy, Payerne, Sassel, Seigneux, Trey, Treytorrens (Payerne), Villars-Bramard and Villarzel came from the District de Payerne to join the Broye-Vully District.

Municipalities
Cerniaz
Champtauroz
Chevroux
Combremont-le-Grand
Combremont-le-Petit
Grandcour
Granges-près-Marnand
Henniez
Marnand
Missy
Payerne
Rossens
Sassel
Sédeilles
Seigneux
Trey
Treytorrens
Villars-Bramard
Villarzel

References

Former districts of the canton of Vaud